The Cross of My Calling is the fourth and final studio album by The (International) Noise Conspiracy. It was recorded at Sunset Sound in Hollywood and is their second full-length album with producer Rick Rubin. It was released through Vagrant/American Recordings on November 25, 2008 in the US and through Burning Heart on November 14, 2008 in Europe.

Track listing

References

2008 albums
Albums produced by Rick Rubin
The (International) Noise Conspiracy albums
Burning Heart Records albums